The Pieter Nieuwland College  is a secondary school in Amsterdam, the Netherlands, in the district Watergraafsmeer.
The school is named after Pieter Nieuwland. It is a school of further education with the directions VWO and HAVO. The school is a part of the ZAAM Group.

From this school a new Gymnasium was started, the Cygnus Gymnasium. The Gymnasium is the same level of education as Atheneum but with an additional focus on ancient languages such as Greek and Latin.

Profiles
In the Education in the Netherlands, one has to choose a profile to follow from the third year of secondary school up until graduation. These are the numbers of the Pieter Nieuwland College.

External links
Official site
Inspection report

Schools in Amsterdam
Secondary schools in the Netherlands